Fulton Park is a park in Bedford-Stuyvesant, Brooklyn, New York City, named after Robert Fulton, who is best known for launching the first commercially successful steamboat. The site on Chauncey Street was acquired by the City in 1904 for just over $300,000.

References

External links 
 http://www.nycgovparks.org/parks/fultonpark/

Parks in Brooklyn
Bedford–Stuyvesant, Brooklyn